Baryssiniella hieroglyphica is a species of longhorn beetles of the subfamily Lamiinae. It was described by Berkov and Monne in 2010, and is known from Peru.

References

Beetles described in 2010
Endemic fauna of Peru
Acanthocinini